The Chilean Academy of History is a Chilean institution dedicated to fostering interest in historical studies through publications, conferences, and competitions.

External links
 Academia Chilena de la Historia's First newsletter
Academia Chilena de la Historia Website

Mexico
History institutes
History organisations based in Chile
Organizations established in 1897
1897 establishments in Chile